The 2018 Los Angeles Valiant season was the first season of Los Angeles Valiant's existence in the Overwatch League. The team finished with a regular season record of 27–13 – the second best in the Overwatch League.

Los Angeles qualified for the Stage 3 and Stage 4 Playoffs. The team lost in the Stage 3 semifinals to the New York Excelsior. Los Angeles found revenge in the Stage 4 finals when the defeated the New York Excelsior. The team qualified for the Season Playoffs, but lost to the would-be champions London Spitfire in the semifinals.

Preceding offseason 
Valiant revealed their inaugural season starting roster over a series of Twitter posts from October 30 to November 2, consisting of the following players:
Brady "Agilities" Girardi
Terence "Soon" Tarlier
Ted "silkthread" Wang
Christopher "GrimReality" Schaefer
Park "Kariv" Young-seo
Stefano "Verbo" Disalvo
Benjamin "uNKOE" Chevasson
Indy "SPACE" Halpern
Koo "Fate" Pan-seung
Seb "Numlocked" Barton
Lee "Envy" Kang-jae

Review 
Los Angeles Valiant's first OWL regular season game was a 4–0 victory against the San Francisco Shock on January 10, 2018. The Valiant posted an impressive 7–3 record in Stage 1, but did not qualify for the Stage 1 Playoffs. On February 19, two days before the beginning of Stage 2, the Los Angeles Valiant announced the departure of head coach Henry "Cuddles" Coxall. The team announced, on the same day, the hiring of Byung Chul "Moon" Moon as the team's new head coach. Stage 2 ended in a disappointing 4–6 record.

The Valiant had a more successful Stage 3, as the team posted a 7–3 record – good for the 3rd seed in the Stage 3 Playoffs. The team faced off against the 2nd-seeded New York Excelsior in the semifinals of the Stage 3 Playoffs, but the Valiant lost in a 0–3 sweep.

Los Angeles Valiant had its best stage in the 4th stage. The team was undefeated going into the final regular season game against the Dallas Fuel. The Valiant lost that matchup by a score of 3 to 1, giving them a 9–1 record and the 2nd seed for the Stage 4 Playoffs. The Valiant faced their intercity-rivals and top-seeded team, the Los Angeles Gladiators, in the semifinals, and were able to pull off a 3–2 victory to move on the finals against the New York Excelsior. On June 17, the Los Angeles Valiant claimed their first-ever stage title, defeating the Excelsior 3–1 in the Stage 4 Finals.

The Valiant ended the regular season with a 27–13 record and the 2nd seed and a first-round bye in the Season Playoffs. The team's was set to face the London Spitfire in the season semifinals. The first matchup was on July 18, in which the Valiant fell to the Spitfire by a score of 1–3. On July 20, the Valiant was eliminated from the Season Playoffs after getting swept 0–3 in the second semifinal match against the Spitfire.

Final roster

Transactions 
Transactions of/for players on the roster during the 2018 regular season:
On March 31, Valiant acquired Chae "Bunny" Jun-hyeok from Seoul Dynasty.
On April 2, Valiant released Lee "Envy" Kang-jae and Christopher "GrimReality" Schaefer.
On April 2, Valiant traded Benjamin "uNKOE" Chevasson to Dallas Fuel in exchange for Scott "Custa" Kennedy.
On April 3, Valiant transferred Ted "silkthread" Wang to Los Angeles Gladiators.
On April 4, Valiant signed Kyle "KSF" Frandanisa and Finnbjörn "Finnsi" Jónasson.
On April 13, Valiant signed Kim "Izayaki" Min-chul.

Standings

Record by stage

League

Game log

Preseason

Regular season

Playoffs

References 

2018 Overwatch League seasons by team
Los Angeles Valiant
Los Angeles Valiant seasons